The Secret of Santa Vittoria is a 1969 American war film distributed by United Artists. It was produced and directed by Stanley Kramer and co-produced by George Glass from a screenplay by Ben Maddow and William Rose. It was based on the best-selling 1966 novel by Robert Crichton. The music score was by Ernest Gold and the cinematography by Giuseppe Rotunno.

The film stars Anthony Quinn, Anna Magnani, Virna Lisi, Hardy Krüger, and Sergio Franchi. It also features Renato Rascel, Giancarlo Giannini, and Eduardo Ciannelli; with Valentina Cortese making an uncredited appearance. It was shot almost entirely on location in Anticoli Corrado, Italy (near Rome).

Plot
The story is set during World War II in the summer of 1943, immediately after the fall of Italy's Fascist government under Benito Mussolini, when the German army moved to occupy most of the country. The only substantial source of income for the little hill town of Santa Vittoria is its wine. The townsfolk learn that the German occupation forces will be arriving soon, with plans to confiscate most of Santa Vittoria's wine and transport it to Germany. The people organize under the inspiration of their new mayor, Italo Bombolini (Anthony Quinn), who until days before had been thought of as a buffoon by everyone in town including his wife (Anna Magnani), and had only been appointed mayor by the town’s pro-Mussolini politicians as a ruse to deflect the people’s anger. With everyone working together, the villagers are able to hide a million bottles of wine by sealing them up in the galleries of an ancient Roman cave before the arrival of a German army detachment under the command of Sepp von Prum (Hardy Krüger).

The Germans, when they arrive, confiscate most of the almost 320,000 bottles of wine the villagers had left for them to find. However, the Germans have accounting records that there is supposed to be five times as many bottles. Von Prum comes to suspect the rest is hidden in or near Santa Vittoria. He and Bombolini, two very different men, engage in a battle of wits in the days that follow. The Germans’ search is made complicated when von Prum becomes infatuated with Caterina Malatesta (Virna Lisi), an educated and elegant woman unlike any other in town. She is secretly sheltering and has fallen in love with Tufa (Sergio Franchi), a wounded captain in the Royal Italian Army, who, as it happens, has provided much of the brainpower for the town’s so far successful wine-hiding plans.

Von Prum orders every building and home and the surrounding area searched. His men find no wine, but they discover Tufa hiding in Caterina’s home. Later von Prum, who by now is absolutely certain the village is indeed hiding one million bottles of wine from him, orders several villagers to be tortured into revealing its location. However, the villagers cunningly arrange for the Germans to select the pro-Mussolini politicians to be tortured, who because they had been arrested shortly after Bombolini had become mayor, genuinely do not know anything about any hidden wine.

Finally, with time running out before the Germans must withdraw north toward the Gustav Line, a frustrated von Prum threatens to shoot mayor Bombolini in front of the assembled townspeople unless the hidden wine's location is told. No one speaks up. Not being a Nazi fanatic, and perhaps also because he had been somewhat appeased by Caterina’s having spent the previous night with him, which she did to save Tufa from being executed for desertion, von Prum silently accepts defeat and leaves the town without harming the mayor. After the Germans leave Santa Vittoria, the townspeople, led by Bombolini, celebrate their victory by dancing in the streets.

Cast

Anthony Quinn as Italo Bombolini
Virna Lisi as Caterina Malatesta
Hardy Krüger as Sepp von Prum
Sergio Franchi as Carlo Tufa
Anna Magnani as Rosa Bombolini
Renato Rascel as Babbaluche
Giancarlo Giannini as Fabio de la Romagna
Patrizia Valturri as Angela Bombolini
Eduardo Ciannelli as Luigi
Leopoldo Trieste as Vittorini
Gigi Ballista as Padre Polenta
 Quinto Parmeggiani as Cop

Release
The world premiere was held in Westwood, Los Angeles on October 17, 1969 to benefit the Reiss-Davis Child Study Center, with Gregory Peck as chairman.

It was selected as the opening-night film for the 13th Annual San Francisco International Film Festival.

Reception
The film earned theatrical rentals of $2.7 million in the United States and Canada and $6.5 million worldwide, which was considered a disappointment considering the popularity of the novel.

Awards and nominations
The film was nominated for two Academy Awards for Best Film Editing (William A. Lyon and Earle Herdan) and Best Music Score (Ernest Gold). It was nominated for an Eddie award by the American Cinema Editors for best edited feature film.

The film won the Golden Globe Award for Best Motion Picture Comedy and was nominated by the Golden Globe Awards committee for Best Director (Stanley Kramer), Best Actor Comedy (Anthony Quinn), Best Actress Comedy (Anna Magnani), Best Original Score (Ernest Gold) and Best Original Song ("Stay", Ernest Gold and Norman Gimbel)

See also
 List of American films of 1969

References

External links

The Secret of Santa Vittoria at Rotten Tomatoes
The Secret of Santa Vittoria at TV Guide (revised form of this 1987 write-up was originally published in The Motion Picture Guide)

1969 films
1969 comedy films
American comedy films
Films based on American novels
Best Musical or Comedy Picture Golden Globe winners
Films directed by Stanley Kramer
Films produced by Stanley Kramer
United Artists films
Italian Campaign of World War II films
Films scored by Ernest Gold
Films about wine
1960s English-language films
1960s American films